...Qué Hago Aquí? is the debut studio album by Mexican Pop rock singer Gloria Trevi. The album became popular with the mainstream Mexican audience because of songs such as "Dr. Psiquiatra", "Satisfecha", "Ultimo Beso", and "Mañana". This album is noted for using two popular English language songs: "Last Kiss" and "Satisfaction", but both songs were sung in Spanish (in the version of a woman to a man, as Trevi would later describe it).

Track listing

References

External links
official Gloria Trevi website

Gloria Trevi albums
1989 debut albums
Spanish-language albums
Sony International albums